Gökhan Akkan (born 1 January 1995) is a Turkish footballer who plays as a goalkeeper for Turkish Süper Lig club Ankaragücü on loan from Çaykur Rizespor.

International career
Akkan has represented Turkey at various youth levels. He debuted for the senior Turkey national team in a friendly 2–1 win over Azerbaijan on 27 May 2021.

References

1995 births
Living people
Sportspeople from Yozgat
Turkish footballers
Turkey youth international footballers
Turkey international footballers
Turkey under-21 international footballers
MKE Ankaragücü footballers
Çaykur Rizespor footballers
Süper Lig players
TFF First League players
TFF Second League players
Association football goalkeepers